Kongsfjord is a fishing settlement in the municipality of Berlevåg in Finnmark, Norway. It is one out of two preserved "" localities in Finnmark.

References

Villages in Finnmark
Berlevåg